Reminders is a task management program developed by Apple Inc. for their iOS, macOS and watchOS platforms that allows users to create lists and set notifications for themselves. The app was first introduced in iOS 5 and OS X 10.8 "Mountain Lion" and was rebuilt from the ground up with the release of iOS 13.

Features
Reminders are placed into four categories which can be found at the top of the screen; "Today", "Scheduled", "All", and "Flagged". Users can also create their own lists of reminders. New reminders can be placed into lists or set as subtasks and can include several details including: a priority tag, a note about the reminder, and an image or URL attachment.

Tasks appear in the Notification Center 24 hours before the time a reminder is set for. Additionally, alarms can be set for reminders, sending a notification to users at a certain time and date, when a geofence around an area is crossed, or when a message starts being typed to a set contact. If a time-based alert is set, it can repeat every day, week, two weeks, month, or year.

Reminders can be marked as completed (checked) and are automatically hidden. Lists can be synced between iOS and macOS through iCloud as well as shared with other contacts. Once shared, tasks can be added or completed by anyone with access to a list and specific reminders can be assigned to different people.

References

IOS-based software made by Apple Inc.
IOS software
Utilities for macOS
Task management software